DWND (88.5 FM) is a radio station owned and operated by Northeastern Broadcasting Services. Its studios and transmitter are located in Isabela Hotel, Brgy. Minante 1, Cauayan, Isabela.

References

External links
NBS FB Page

Radio stations in Isabela (province)
Radio stations established in 1990